Whaddon is a hamlet in the civil parish of Hilperton, Wiltshire, England.

Location 
It is only accessible via Whaddon Lane which connects the hamlet to Hilperton.

The River Avon and the Kennet and Avon Canal, half a mile apart, define the natural boundaries of the hamlet. The river separates Whaddon from the village of Holt, and the canal separates it from Hilperton and Semington.

History 
Archaeological finds at the current location of the hamlet indicate occupation as early as the Iron Age, lasting into Roman times. Under the name of Wadone, the village is mentioned in the Domesday Book of 1086, being held by a Saxon called Alvric, supporting two plough teams, and also having meadow and pasture. The Saxons used wood both for building and their utensils, so they have left little evidence in the archaeological record, other than a possible fragment of late Saxon pottery found at the site. At that time, Whaddon included Paxcroft, now part of Hilperton; the total population would probably have been between 15 and 25 people. The village was then located on the major road going from Trowbridge through Hilperton to Whaddon and then alongside the river Avon to Melksham. By 1428, the population of Whaddon counted 10 householders; then it rose to 36 people in 1801 and further to 63 in 1821.

For a long time, Whaddon was a separate parish; but in 1894 it was merged with Semington parish, and since then the population of Whaddon on its own has not been recorded. It was not until the late 20th century that Whaddon was united with its more obvious neighbour, Hilperton.

St. Mary's Church 
The church of St. Mary the Virgin was built by the 12th century and still contains a blocked 12th century north doorway and a reconstructed 12th century south doorway with a decorated tympanum. Later in the 14th century the church was altered, and the door is made of two 14th century oak panels with heavy hinges. In 1676-8 the church was rebuilt, and c.1778 pulled down and rebuilt again. The present chancel was built in 1879 because damage to the foundations, caused by the work of 1778, was responsible for cracks in the walls and roof damage.  It is Grade II* listed.

References

External links 
 Hilperton parish at Wiltshire Community History

Hamlets in Wiltshire
Former civil parishes in Wiltshire